The Third Deakin ministry (Liberal) was the 7th ministry of the Government of Australia. It was led by the country's 2nd Prime Minister, Alfred Deakin. The Fourth Deakin ministry succeeded the First Fisher ministry, which dissolved on 2 June 1909 after the Protectionist Party and the Anti-Socialist Party merged into the Liberal Party "fusion" and withdrew their support in order to form what became the first majority government in federal Australian history. The ministry was replaced by the Second Fisher ministry on 29 April 1910 following the federal election that took place on 13 April which saw the Labour Party defeat the Liberals.

Joseph Cook, who died in 1947, was the last surviving member of the Third Deakin ministry.

Ministry

Notes

Ministries of Edward VII
Deakin, 3
1909 establishments in Australia
1910 disestablishments in Australia
Cabinets established in 1909
Cabinets disestablished in 1910